From A to B may refer to:

From A to B in geometry
From A to B (New Musik album)
From A to B (Octopus album)
From A to B (film), a 2015 Emirati film